The 1917 St. Louis Cardinals season was the team's 36th season in St. Louis, Missouri and the 26th season in the National League. The Cardinals went 82–70 during the season and finished 3rd in the National League.

Regular season 
Rogers Hornsby began to establish himself as an elite hitter. Hornsby had a .327 batting average which was second in the league. He led the league in triples (17), total bases (253), and slugging percentage (.484).

Season standings

Record vs. opponents

Roster

Player stats

Batting

Starters by position 
Note: Pos = Position; G = Games played; AB = At bats; H = Hits; Avg. = Batting average; HR = Home runs; RBI = Runs batted in

Other batters 
Note: G = Games played; AB = At bats; H = Hits; Avg. = Batting average; HR = Home runs; RBI = Runs batted in

Pitching

Starting pitchers 
Note: G = Games pitched; IP = Innings pitched; W = Wins; L = Losses; ERA = Earned run average; SO = Strikeouts

Other pitchers 
Note: G = Games pitched; IP = Innings pitched; W = Wins; L = Losses; ERA = Earned run average; SO = Strikeouts

Relief pitchers 
Note: G = Games pitched; W = Wins; L = Losses; SV = Saves; ERA = Earned run average; SO = Strikeouts

External links
1917 St. Louis Cardinals at Baseball Reference
1917 St. Louis Cardinals team page at www.baseball-almanac.com

St. Louis Cardinals seasons
Saint Louis Cardinals season
St Louis